Stanford Freese is an American tuba player and musical director who is the talent casting and booking director with Disney Entertainment Productions (The Walt Disney Company).

Born in Minnesota, Freese has worked as a musical director at the Walt Disney Company for over 40 years, including as director of bands at both the Walt Disney World Resort and the Disneyland Resort. He was a show director for Tokyo Disneyland, an entertainment producer for Pleasure Island and Walt Disney World, and a musical show director for Tokyo DisneySea. Freese is the talent and casting director for Disneyland.

Early life and education 
A graduate of the University of Minnesota, Freese was selected by the Bureau of Educational and Cultural Affairs as a tuba soloist with the Minnesota concert band that toured the Soviet Union, in a performance for the President of the United States at the White House. Freese was chosen again by the government to tour China as a tuba soloist with the Minnesota band on a goodwill tour.

Career 
Freese began his musical career in Hollywood, where he produced and performed in television and motion picture soundtrack recordings until 1977, when he was hired by Disney and moved to Orlando, Florida to serve as the leader of the Walt Disney World Band. Two years later, Walt Disney World Band relocated to Disneyland, where he became Director of Bands and began re-envisioning the musical programming for Disneyland and the upcoming Disney California Adventure theme park.

Awards and recognition 

In 1995, Freese was inducted into the Minnesota Music Hall of Fame. In 1997, he was the recipient of the Classic Conference Fine Arts and Distinguished Service Award. In 2007, he was inducted into the Edina Hall of Fame and awarded the Outstanding Acievement Award by the University of Minnesota. Also in 2007, he entered the Guinness Book of World Records as producer of the largest Tuba Christmas Ensemble in the world consisting of over 500 tubas performing in concert at Downtown Disney. In 2008, he received the Disney Entertainment Excellence Award. In 2009 and 2010, he was recognized by the United States Armed Forces School of Music for participation and training of United States Army senior bandleaders for the United States military bands. In 2010, he received the Disney Entertainment Hall of Fame Award and the NAMM Association School JAM USA Award on behalf of the Walt Disney Company. In 2011, he received the Orange County Lifetime Achievement Award.

Personal life 
Freese is married to Tera Freese and has two sons, Josh and Jason, both studio and touring musicians. Josh is a member of the Vandals and Devo. Jason is primarily a studio musician.

References

External links 

American bandleaders
American tubists
Musicians from Minnesota
People from Edina, Minnesota
University of Minnesota alumni
1945 births
Living people
21st-century tubists
Walt Disney Parks and Resorts people
Directors of The Walt Disney Company
Disney people